The Bornean black magpie (Platysmurus aterrimus), also known as the black crested magpie, is a treepie in the family Corvidae. It is endemic to the Southeast Asian island of Borneo.

Taxonomy
The Bornean black magpie was formerly considered a distinctive subspecies of the black magpie, but more recent revisions now consider it a full species, Platysmurus aterrimus.

Description
The magpie is about 43 cm in length. It has all-black plumage with a long, broad and graduated tail, a stout black bill, a tall, bristly crest, black legs and feet, and red irises. It has a taller crest than, and lacks the white wing patch of, the nominate subspecies.

Behaviour
The magpie is a garrulous and sociable bird, often seen in family parties. It has a variety of whistling and chattering calls and is also a vocal mimic. It flies with shallow wing beats that produce a distinctive low throbbing whoo or boobooboo sound.

Breeding
A nest found in the Tabin Wildlife Reserve in September 1981 was described as being about 20 cm across, built of sticks and sited 8 m up in a small tree.

Feeding
The magpie is an arboreal, foliage-gleaning, insectivore and frugivore, also opportunistically taking small mammals and reptiles.

Distribution and habitat
The magpie is found in the lowlands of Borneo, ranging in altitude up to about 300 m above sea level. It inhabits primary forest, including dipterocarp, kerangas and peat swamp forest, and is also found in secondary forest, overgrown tree plantations and scrub.

References

Endemic birds of Borneo
Platysmurus
Birds described in 1831
Taxa named by René Lesson